Eugène Le Goff (2 September 1909 – 17 March 1998) was a French racing cyclist. He rode in the 1933 Tour de France.

References

1909 births
1998 deaths
French male cyclists
Place of birth missing